Andrew Dari Chiwitey (born 27 September 1970)is a Ghanaian politician and member of the Seventh Parliament of the Fourth Republic of Ghana representing the Sawla-Tuna Kalba Constituency in the Northern Region on the ticket of the National Democratic Congress
.

Early life and education 
Chiwitey hails from Nakoiyiri in the Northern Region of Ghana. He holds an HND in Sec/Management Studies from Tamale Polytechnic  , Masters in Human Resource Development  and a B.A, Master of Arts from the University of Cape Coast.

References 

Ghanaian MPs 2017–2021
1970 births
Living people
National Democratic Congress (Ghana) politicians
Ghanaian MPs 2021–2025